Vivenda do Camarão (House of Shrimp), is a Brazilian restaurant chain. It opened its first U.S. restaurant in Coral Springs, Florida. U.S. locations use the name The Shrimp House. The company plans to open 8 restaurants in Florida in 2014.

See also
 List of seafood restaurants

References

External links
Vivenda do Camarão Brazilian website
 Shrimp House, Seafood Pasta & Grill U.S. website

Fast-food chains of Brazil
Seafood restaurants